Peter Devlin may refer to:
 Peter Devlin (general), 21st-century Canadian Army officer
 Peter Devlin (snooker player)
 Peter J. Devlin, American sound engineer